The Holy Family with Three Hares is a c. 1496 woodcut by German artist Albrecht Dürer (1471–1528). It depicts the Christian Holy Family of Mary, Joseph, and the infant Jesus, in an enclosed garden, symbolizing Mary's virginity. The infant Jesus is reading from what is very probably a book of scripture, representing his close connection with the Word of God, not only because in Christianity he fulfills the Old Testament prophecy of a messiah, but also because in some Christian traditions Jesus has been described as the word of God.

References

Prints by Albrecht Dürer
Woodcuts
1490s works
Rabbits and hares in art
Saint Joseph in art
Angels in art
Prints including the Virgin Mary
Jesus in art
Prints based on the Bible
15th-century prints

Catholic engraving